The United States District Court for the District of Hawaii (in case citations, D. Haw.) is the principal trial court of the United States Federal Court System in the state of Hawaii. The court's territorial jurisdiction encompasses the state of Hawaii and the territories of Midway Atoll, Wake Island, Johnston Atoll, Kingman Reef, Palmyra Atoll, Baker Island, Howland Island, and Jarvis Island; it also occasionally handles (jointly with the United States District Court for the District of Columbia and the High Court of American Samoa) federal issues that arise in the territory of American Samoa, which has no local federal court or territorial court. It is located at the Prince Kuhio Federal Building in downtown Honolulu, fronting the Aloha Tower and Honolulu Harbor. The court hears both civil and criminal cases as a court of law and equity. A branch of the district court is the United States Bankruptcy Court which also has chambers in the federal building. The United States Court of Appeals for the Ninth Circuit has appellate jurisdiction over cases coming out of the District of Hawaii (except for patent claims and claims against the U.S. government under the Tucker Act, which are appealed to the Federal Circuit). The United States Attorney for the District of Hawaii represents the United States in all civil and criminal cases within her district.

 the United States Attorney is Clare E. Connors.

History 
When the Territory of Hawaii was formed in 1900, jurisdiction was placed in the Ninth Circuit. On March 18, 1959, when the District of Hawaii was formed, the district had two judgeships for the court. On July 10, 1984, a third judgeship was added, and a fourth was added on December 1, 1990.

Current judges 
:

Vacancies and pending nominations

Former judges

Chief judges

Succession of seats

Judges of the United States District Court for the Territory of Hawaii 

Prior to 1959, the United States District Court for the District of Hawaii was an Article IV tribunal in the Territory of Hawaii. The following is a partial list of Judges for that court.

"Recorder of Deeds" for the Territory of Palmyra Island 

Since 1962, the court's clerk has filed or recorded the deeds and other land title documents for land located in the federal Territory of Palmyra Island, under , Executive Order No. 10967 and Order No. 2862 of the Secretary of the Interior.

See also 
 Courts of Hawaii
 List of current United States district judges
 List of United States federal courthouses in Hawaii
 United States Court of Appeals for the Ninth Circuit

Notes

External links 
 United States District Court for the District of Hawaii
 U.S. Attorney for the District of Hawaii

Hawaii
Hawaii law
Honolulu
1959 establishments in Hawaii
Courthouses in Hawaii
Courts and tribunals established in 1959